Best in Film: The Greatest Movies of Our Time was a two-hour television special that aired on 22 March 2011 on ABC in the United States. Hosted by Tom Bergeron and Cynthia McFadden, it was a collaboration between ABC News and People magazine that let American viewers vote on their favorite films of all time. The results were presented on the program, which included interviews with some of the stars and directors of the chosen films including Harrison Ford, Anthony Hopkins, and Olivia Newton-John. It also showed out-takes, screen tests and behind-the-scenes footage.

People featured a story that corresponded with the special in its 28 March 2011 issue, which came out on March 18.

The categories for the special were Best Film, Best Sci-Fi Film, Best Musical, Best Action Film, Greatest Film Character, Best Horror Film, Best Chick Flick, Greatest Screen Kiss, Best Comedy, Best Animated Film, Best Suspense/Thriller, Most Romantic Screen Couple, Greatest Line, Best Western Film and Best Political/Historical Film.

The televised special counted down the top five films in 10 of the 15 categories: Best Comedy, Best Sci-Fi Film, Best Musical, Greatest Screen Kiss, Greatest Line, Best Action Film, Best Suspense/Thriller, Best Animated Film, Greatest Film Character and Best Film. The results in the remaining 5 categories (Best Horror Film, Best Chick Flick, Most Romantic Screen Couple, Best Western Film and Best Political/Historical Film) were revealed online.

Voting 
Over 500,000 votes were cast in the online poll, which was open on the ABC News website from late November 2010 to early January 2011. Viewers voted for winners from a list of nominees created by a panel of film industry experts. The panel included actors Kevin Spacey, Susan Sarandon, Gene Hackman, Ed Harris, and Cameron Diaz; directors Ivan Reitman, Mel Brooks, Garry Marshall, Michael Moore and Nora Ephron; producers Jerry Weintraub and Harvey Weinstein; writer Neil Simon, and critics and writers Peter Travers, Janet Maslin, James Lipton, Ben Mankiewicz and People's Alynda Wheat and Larry Hackett.

Television results

Best Comedy
Airplane! (1980)
 Monty Python and the Holy Grail (1975)
 Some Like It Hot (1959)
 Young Frankenstein (1974)
 Tootsie (1982)

Best Sci-Fi Film
 Star Wars: Episode IV – A New Hope (1977)
 E.T. the Extra-Terrestrial (1982)
 Avatar (2009)
 The Matrix (1999)
 Close Encounters of the Third Kind (1977)

Best Musical
 The Sound of Music (1965)
 Grease (1978)
 The Wizard of Oz (1939)
 Singin' in the Rain (1952)
 West Side Story (1961)

Greatest On-Screen Kiss
 Gone with the Wind (1939)
 From Here to Eternity (1953)
 Lady and the Tramp (1955)
 An Officer and a Gentleman (1982)
 Casablanca (1942)

Greatest Line
 "Frankly, my dear, I don't give a damn." – Gone with the Wind (1939)
 "Go ahead, make my day!" – Sudden Impact (1983)
 "I'm gonna make him an offer he can't refuse." – The Godfather (1972)
 "I'll have what she's having." – When Harry Met Sally... (1989)
 "Here's looking at you, kid." – Casablanca (1942)

Best Action Film
 Raiders of the Lost Ark (1981)
 The Dark Knight (2008)
 The Lord of the Rings: The Return of the King (2003)
 Die Hard (1988)
 Gladiator (2000)

Best Suspense/Thriller
 The Silence of the Lambs (1991)
 Jaws (1975)
 Psycho (1960)
 The Shining (1980)
 Pulp Fiction (1994)

Best Animated Film
 The Lion King (1994)
 Toy Story (1995)
 Beauty and the Beast (1991)
 Snow White and the Seven Dwarfs (1937)
 Rango (2011)

Greatest Film Character
 Forrest Gump in Forrest Gump (1994)
 James Bond in the James Bond films
 Scarlett O'Hara in Gone with the Wind (1939)
 Dr. Hannibal Lecter in The Silence of the Lambs (1991)
 Captain Jack Sparrow in the Pirates of the Caribbean films

Best Film
 Gone with the Wind (1939)
 The Wizard of Oz (1939)
 The Godfather (1972)
 Casablanca (1942)
 E.T. the Extra-Terrestrial (1982)

Online results

Most Romantic On-Screen Couple
 Leonardo DiCaprio and Kate Winslet – Titanic (1997)
 Clark Gable and Vivien Leigh – Gone with the Wind (1939)
 Richard Gere and Julia Roberts – Pretty Woman (1990)
 Humphrey Bogart and Ingrid Bergman – Casablanca (1942)
 Spencer Tracy and Katharine Hepburn – Adam's Rib (1949)

Best Horror Film
 The Exorcist (1973)
 Halloween (1978)
 Poltergeist (1982)
 Carrie (1976)
 A Nightmare on Elm Street (1984)

Best Western Film
 Butch Cassidy and the Sundance Kid (1969)
 Dances with Wolves (1990)
 The Good, the Bad and the Ugly (1966)
 Unforgiven (1992)
 The Magnificent Seven (1960)

Best Chick Flick
 The Notebook (2004)
 Dirty Dancing (1987)
 Pretty Woman (1990)
 Sleepless in Seattle (1993)
 The Way We Were (1973)

Best Political/Historical Film
 Schindler's List (1993)
 Doctor Zhivago (1965)
 12 Angry Men (1957)
 All the President's Men (1976)
 Mr. Smith Goes to Washington (1939)

See also
 Best in TV: The Greatest TV Shows of Our Time

References

External links
 Full special at Internet Archive
Results at ABC News

American Broadcasting Company original programming
Top film lists
2011 television specials